Thomas Chaseland (c.1803 – 5 June 1869) was a New Zealand sealer, whaler and pilot. He was born in Australia on c.1803.

In Australia
His father, Thomas Chaseland senior, was a Londoner who arrived in Australia as a convict in 1792. Chaseland senior married fellow prisoner Margaret McMahon and the couple had six children. Chaseland fathered another child with an Aboriginal woman in around 1803. The infant was named Thomas and was born the year before Chaseland senior married and he was raised in the family home with his other children at Windsor.

Thomas Chaseland junior went to work as a teenager at the shipyards on the nearby Hawkesbury River. In August 1815, he joined the crew of the Jupiter on a sealing voyage to the islands of Bass Strait. He next served on the King George on a cruise to the Marquesas Islands for a cargo of pork and sandalwood in 1818. He is next recorded aboard the Governor Macquarie in 1819 bound for New Zealand and Tahiti for seal skins and sandalwood. The vessel later spent time at Kangaroo Island taking aboard a cargo of kangaroo and seal skins.

References

1803 births
1869 deaths
New Zealand people in whaling
Australian emigrants to New Zealand
Sealers
Australian expatriates in New Zealand
Australian people in whaling